Leidos, formerly known as Science Applications International Corporation (SAIC), is an American defense, aviation, information technology (Lockheed Martin IS&GS), and biomedical research company headquartered in Reston, Virginia, that provides scientific, engineering, systems integration, and technical services. Leidos merged with Lockheed Martin's IT sector, Information Systems & Global Solutions, in August 2016 to create the defense industry’s largest IT services provider. The Leidos-Lockheed Martin merger is one of the biggest transactions thus far in the consolidation of a defense sector. Leidos works extensively with the United States Department of Defense, the United States Department of Homeland Security, and the United States Intelligence Community, including the NSA, as well as other U.S. government civil agencies and selected commercial markets.

History

As SAIC

The company was founded by J. Robert "Bob" Beyster in 1969 in the La Jolla neighborhood of San Diego, California, as Science Applications Incorporated (SAI). Beyster, a former scientist for the Westinghouse Atomic Power Division and Los Alamos National Laboratory, who became the chairman of the Accelerator Physics Department of General Atomics in 1957, raised the money to start SAI by selling stock he had received from General Atomics, combined with funds raised from the early employees who bought stock in the young enterprise.

Initially the company's focus was on projects for the U.S. government related to nuclear power and weapons effects study programs.  The company was renamed Science Applications International Corporation (SAIC) as it expanded its operations. Major projects during Beyster's tenure included work on radiation therapy for the Los Alamos National Laboratory; technical support and management assistance to the development of the cruise missile in the 1970s; the cleanups of the Three Mile Island Nuclear Generating Station after its major accident, and of the contaminated community of Love Canal; design and performance evaluation of the Stars & Stripes 87, the winning ship for the 1987 America's Cup; and the design of the first luggage inspection machine to pass new Federal Aviation Administration tests following the terrorist bombing of Pan American flight 103 over Lockerbie, Scotland.

Contrary to traditional business models, Beyster originally designed SAIC as an employee-owned company. This shared ownership was accompanied by shared responsibility and freedom in business development, and allowed SAIC to attract and retain highly educated and motivated employees that helped the company to grow and diversify. After Beyster's retirement in 2003, SAIC conducted an initial public offering of common stock on October 17, 2006. The offering of 86,250,000 shares of common stock was priced at $15.00 per share. The underwriters, Bear Stearns and Morgan Stanley, exercised overallotment options, resulting in 11.25 million shares. The IPO raised US$1.245B. Even then, employee shares retained a privileged status, having ten times the voting power per share over common stock.

In September 2009 SAIC relocated its corporate headquarters to their existing facilities in Tysons Corner in unincorporated Fairfax County, Virginia, near McLean.

In 2012 SAIC was ordered to pay $550 million to the City of New York for overbilling the city over a period of seven years on the CityTime contract. In 2014 Gerard Denault, SAIC's CityTime program manager, and his government contact were sentenced to 20 years in prison for fraud and bribery related to that contract.

As Leidos

In August 2012, SAIC announced its plans to split into two publicly traded companies. The company spun off about a third of its business, forming an approximately $4 billion-per-year service company focused on government services, including systems engineering, technical assistance, financial analysis, and program office support. The remaining part became a $7 billion-per-year IT company specializing in technology for the national security, health, and engineering sectors. The smaller company was led by Tony Moraco, who beforehand was leading SAIC's Intelligence, Surveillance and Reconnaissance group, and the bigger one was led by John P. Jumper. The split has allowed both companies to pursue more business, which it could not pursue as a single company which would have resulted in conflicts of interest. In February 2013, it was announced that the smaller spin-off company would get the name "Science Applications International Corporation" and stay in the current headquarters, while the larger company would change its name to Leidos, (created by clipping the word kaleidoscope) and would move its headquarters to Reston, Virginia. The split was structured in a way that SAIC changed its name to Leidos, then spun off the new SAIC as a separate publicly traded company. However, Leidos is the legal successor of the original SAIC and retains SAIC's pre-2013 stock price and corporate filing history.

On September 27, 2013, SAIC changed its name to Leidos and spun off a new and independent $4 billion government services and information technology company which retained the Science Applications International Corporation name; Leidos is the direct successor to the original SAIC. Before the split, Leidos employed 39,600 employees and reported $11.17 billion in revenue and $525 million net income for its fiscal year ended January 31, 2013, making it number 240 on the Fortune 500 list. In 2014, Leidos reported US$5.06 billion in revenue.

In August 2016, the deal to merge with the entirety of Lockheed Martin's Information Systems & Global Solutions (IS&GS) business came to a close, more than doubling the size of Leidos and its portfolio, and positioning the company as the global defense industry's largest enterprise in the federal technology sector. , the company has 45,000 employees. In 2022, Leidos reported US$14.4 billion in revenue. It ranked 274 on the 2022 Fortune 500 list.

In January 2020, Leidos purchased defense contractor Dynetics for approximately $1.65 billion.  In May 2020 it purchased the Security Detection and Automation Systems division of L3Harris (notable for providing the detection screeners that all airport travelers pass through when flying).

Structure

Leidos has four central divisions: Civil, Health, Advanced Solutions, and Defense & Intelligence. The Civil Division focuses on integrating aviation systems, securing transportation measures, modernizing IT infrastructure, and engineering energy efficiently. The Health Division focuses on optimizing medical enterprises, securing private medical data, and improving collection and data entry methods. The Advanced Solutions Division is centered around data analysis, integrating advanced defense and intelligence systems, and increasing surveillance and reconnaissance efficiency. The Defense & Intelligence Division focuses on providing air service systems, geospatial analysis, cybersecurity, intelligence analysis, and supporting operations efforts.

Management

CEO: Roger Krone

After more than 30 years of Beyster's leadership, Kenneth C. Dahlberg was named the CEO of SAIC in November 2003. In May 2005, the company changed its external tagline from An Employee-Owned Company to From Science to Solutions.

The third CEO was Walt Havenstein, who pushed for tighter integration of the company's historically autonomous divisions, which led to lower profit and revenue. The strategy was reversed by the fourth CEO, retired Air Force general John P. Jumper, appointed in 2012. On July 1, 2014, Leidos announced that Roger Krone would become its CEO on July 14, 2014. As of 2019, Krone is the Chairman and CEO of Leidos.

Headquarters

In January 2018, Leidos announced it would move within Reston, VA, a quarter mile from 11951 Freedom Drive to 1750 Presidents Street. The new building was completed in early 2020.

Operations

The Defense Intelligence Agency (DIA) transitioned a Remote Viewing Program to SAIC in 1991 which was renamed Stargate Project.

In March 2001, SAIC defined the concept for the NSA Trailblazer Project. In 2002, NSA contracted SAIC for $280 million to produce a "technology demonstration platform"  for the agency's project, a "Digital Network Intelligence" system to analyze data carried on computer networks. Other project participants included Boeing, Computer Sciences Corporation, and Booz Allen Hamilton. According to science news site PhysOrg.com, Trailblazer was a continuation of the earlier ThinThread program. In 2005, NSA director Michael Hayden told a Senate hearing that the Trailblazer program was several hundred million dollars over budget and years behind schedule.

In fiscal year 2003, SAIC did more than $2.6 billion in business with the United States Department of Defense, making it the ninth-largest defense contractor in the United States. Other large contracts included a bid for information technology for the 2004 Olympics in Greece.

From 2001 to 2005, SAIC was the primary contractor for the FBI's unsuccessful Virtual Case File project.

During fiscal year 2012 (latest figure available), SAIC had more than doubled its business with the DoD to $5,988,489,000, and was the 4th-largest defense contractor on the annual list of the top 100. Leidos ranked 292 on the 2017 Fortune 500 list.

Subsidiaries

Dynetics, Inc., a wholly owned subsidiary of Leidos since Jan 2020.
Leidos Biomedical Research, Inc., formerly SAIC - Frederick, a wholly owned subsidiary of Leidos manages Frederick National Laboratory for Cancer Research.
Gibbs & Cox, a wholly owned subsidiary of Leidos since May 7, 2021.
MEDPROTECT, LLC supports US government health-payer organizations
Reveal, develops dual-energy X-ray computed tomography systems for explosives-detection at airports and similar facilities 
CloudShield Technologies a wholly owned subsidiary, specializing in cyber-security
Varec, Inc., liquid petroleum asset management company
Leidos Health
Leidos Canada, formerly SAIC Canada, wholly owned subsidiary, works with Canadian government.
Leidos Australia (Leidos Pty Ltd), wholly owned subsidiary, specializing in document technologies and cyber-security. Produces TeraText software.
Leidos UK (Leidos Innovations UK Ltd, Leidos Europe Ltd, Leidos Supply Ltd & Leidos Ltd), wholly owned subsidiary, specializing in managed IT Services, developing of bespoke products. Produces, supports & maintains the Chroma Airport Suite, also responsible for the MOD's Supply Chain.
Leidos Engineering, LLC, formerly SAIC Energy, Environment & Infrastructure LLC, assembles the legacy of engineering capabilities of Benham Investment Holdings, LLC, R. W. Beck Group, Inc., and Patrick Energy Services.
QTC Management, Inc., acquired by merging with Lockheed Martin IS&GS.
Systems Made Simple (SMS), acquired by merging with Lockheed Martin IS&GS.

Former subsidiaries 

AMSEC LLC, a business partnership between SAIC and Northrop Grumman subsidiary Newport News Shipbuilding divested on July 13, 2007. Network Solutions was acquired by SAIC in 1995, and subsequently was acquired by VeriSign, Inc. for $21 billion.Leidos Cyber, Inc., formerly Lockheed Martin Industrial Defender, acquired by merging with Lockheed Martin IS&GS, was sold to Capgemini in 2018.

Controversies

As SAIC 

Then-SAIC had as part of its management and on its board of directors, many well-known ex-government personnel including Melvin Laird, Secretary of Defense in the  Nixon administration; William Perry, Secretary of Defense for Bill Clinton; John M. Deutch, Director of Central Intelligence under President Clinton; Admiral Bobby Ray Inman who served in various capacities in the National Security Agency (NSA) and Central Intelligence Agency (CIA) for the Ford, Carter and Reagan administrations; and David Kay who led the search for weapons of mass destruction after the 1991 Gulf War and served under the Bush administration after the 2003 invasion of Iraq. In 2022, 30 out of 38 Leidos Inc. lobbyists previously held government jobs.

In June 2001, the Federal Bureau of Investigation (FBI) paid SAIC million to create a Virtual Case File (VCF) software system to speed up the sharing of information among agents. But the FBI abandoned VCF when it failed to function adequately. Robert Mueller, FBI Director, testified to a congressional committee, "When SAIC delivered the first product in December 2003 we immediately identified a number of deficiencies – 17 at the outset. That soon cascaded to 50 or more and ultimately to 400 problems with that software ... We were indeed disappointed."

In 2005, then-SAIC executive vice president Arnold L. Punaro claimed that the company had "fully conformed to the contract we have and gave the taxpayers real value for their money." He blamed the FBI for the initial problems, saying the agency had a parade of program managers and demanded too many design changes. He stated that during 15 months that SAIC worked on the program, 19 different government managers were involved and 36 contract modifications were ordered. "There were an average of 1.3 changes every day from the FBI, for a total of 399 changes during the period," Punaro said.

In 2011–2012, then-SAIC was among the 8 top contributors to federal candidates, parties, and outside groups with  during the 2011–2012 election cycle according to information from the Federal Election Commission. The top candidate recipient was Barack Obama.

As Leidos 

In a heavily redacted report dated January 3, 2018, the Inspector General for the Department of Defense determined that a supervisor at Leidos made “inappropriate sexual and racial comments to” a female contractor, and that when she complained of a hostile work environment, Leidos retaliated by excluding her from further work on an additional contract. The report found that Leidos's claim that the contract employee “exhibited poor performance throughout her employment" lacked supporting evidence. It recommended that U.S. Secretary of Defense Jim Mattis “consider appropriate action against Leidos” such as “compensatory damages, including back pay, employee benefits and other terms and conditions of employment” that the contractor would have received under the additional contract.

In 2018, Leidos donated to the Senate campaign of Cindy Hyde-Smith. However, after a video was released showing Hyde-Smith speaking fondly of participating in "public hangings", Leidos said the company would never have made the donation if it had known about the comment. During Hyde-Smith's 2020 re-election bid, Leidos again donated to her.

See also
 Top 100 Contractors of the U.S. federal government

References

Further reading

External links

 

Defense companies of the United States
Companies listed on the New York Stock Exchange
Engineering companies of the United States
American companies established in 1969
Consulting firms established in 1969
Technology companies established in 1969
1969 establishments in California
Companies based in Reston, Virginia
Information technology consulting firms of the United States
International information technology consulting firms
2006 initial public offerings
Love Canal